Bu liao qing (不了情) may refer to:

 Bu Liao Qing (1947 film), written by Eileen Chang
 Bu Liao Qing, also called Love Without End, a 1961 film, starring Lin Dai
 "Buliao qing" (song), a 1961 Mandarin song
 Bu liao qing, an album by Tsai Chin
 Bu Liao Qing (TV series), a 1989 Taiwanese television series, starring Kenny Ho (actor)

See also 
 Xin Bu Liao Qing (disambiguation)